Live 88 may refer to:

 Live '88 (Supertramp album)
 Live '88 (Shawn Colvin album)
 Live 88 (Ekatarina Velika album)